A pawnbroker is an individual or business that offers secured loans to people, with items of personal property used as collateral.

Pawnbroker may refer to:
 The Pawnbroker, a novel by Edward Lewis Wallant
 The Pawnbroker (film), a 1964 American drama film
 Pawnbroker (dragster), a 1969 rear-engined dragster

See also
 Pawn shop (disambiguation)